Clam liquor, also called clam extract, is a liquid extracted during cooking and opening of clams. Undiluted it is called clam broth, and when concentrated by evaporation is called clam nectar. It may be canned in all these forms or used to fill up canned clam meat.

See also
 List of clam dishes

References

Clam dishes
Food ingredients